St. Astvatsatsin Church was an Armenian church located in Darkənd village (Ordubad district) of the Nakhchivan Autonomous Republic of Azerbaijan. The church was located in the center of the village.

History 
The church was built in the 17th century and was renovated in 1895.

Architecture 
The church was a three-naved basilica with a semicircular apse with vestries on either side. The entrance to the church was on the west, and there were inscriptions on the eastern facade. The building of the church had been turned into a village shop during the Soviet times.

Destruction 
The building of the church was still intact in 2004. However, by 2010, the church had been torn down and a new structure, with smaller dimensions, built in its place, according to investigation of the Caucasus Heritage Watch.

References   

Armenian churches in Azerbaijan
Ruins in Azerbaijan